Kingswood College is a private, Methodist co-educational school in Makhanda (Grahamstown), Eastern Cape, South Africa attended by boarding and day scholars, and a  member of the Independent Schools Association of South Africa. The school leavers write the matriculation examinations set by the Independent Examinations Board (IEB).

History 

Kingswood College is one of the oldest Methodist boarding schools in the country. It derives its name and ideals from Kingswood School, the 18th century college established by John Wesley  near Bristol, England, in 1748.

The Reverend William Shaw was a Methodist minister who came to Eastern Cape as a member of Sephton's party of 1820 Settlers, he founded the Salem Academy in Salem in the Albany district in the 1830s. The Academy was subsequently moved to Grahamstown where it was renamed the Shaw College, and later the Wesleyan Collegiate School for Boys. In 1896 the Wesleyan Collegiate School for Boys was located on the site that is the present home of Kingswood College.

Kingswood College was founded by Daniel Knight in 1894.

Sport 
Kingswood College has been performing very well on sports during the year. 

The sports that are offered in the school are:

 Athletics
 Basketball
 Chess
 Cricket
 Golf
 Hockey
 Netball
 Rugby
 Squash
 Swimming
 Tennis
 Water polo

Notable alumni 

 Neil Aggett, medical doctor and political activist who died in police custody
 Chris Bennett (admiral)
 Tiny Francis, rugby player
 Geoffrey de Jager, businessman and philanthropist
 Fabian Juries, rugby player
 Jeremy Mansfield, radio and TV personality
 Sir Allan Mossop, Chief Judge of the British Supreme Court for China
 Bennie Osler, rugby player
 Meyrick Pringle, cricketer
 Brett Wilkinson, rugby player
 David Denton, rugby player
 Grant Hattingh, rugby player
 Rosco Speckman, rugby player and Olympic Bronze Medalist
 Brett Schultz, cricketer
 Jack Slater, rugby Springbok
 Denys Hobson, cricketer
 David Divine, novelist, Distinguished Service Medal (WW2), CBE (Commander of the Order of the British Empire)
 Harvey Tyson, author and former editor of THE STAR newspaper
 Graham Beck, internationally acclaimed business magnate, wine maker, stud farmer and philanthropist
 Percy Scholes
 Uyinene Mrwetyana, key figure in the movement against gender-based violence in South Africa.

Notes and references

External links 

 
 Independent Schools Association of South Africa

Boarding schools in South Africa
Methodist schools in South Africa
Private schools in the Eastern Cape
Educational institutions established in 1894
Buildings and structures in Makhanda, Eastern Cape
1894 establishments in the Cape Colony